Parliamentary elections were held in Hungary between 12 June and 9 July 1872. The result was a victory for the Deák Party, which won 245 of the 427 seats.

Results

Hungary
Election
Elections in Hungary
Elections in Austria-Hungary

hu:Magyarországi országgyűlési választások a dualizmus korában#1872